Union Sportive Entraigues XIII are a rugby league team based in Entraigues-sur-la-Sorgue in the region of Vaucluse in the south-west of France. They play in the Elite Two Championship the second tier of rugby league in France. Their home ground is the Stade Georges Mauro.

History 

The first significant date in US Entraigues XIII history occurred in 1967 when the club won the National 2 league, now called the National Division 1 beating SO Avignon in the final. In season 1975-6 they once again reached the National 2 league final this time losing to Salon XIII 2-13. The club were twice runners-up again in the same league in 1988-89 they were beaten by Le Pontet XIII 9-15 and in season 1990-91 they lost out to Saint-Hyppolite 9-17 but were promoted to the National League 1 now called Elite Two Championship for the first time in their history. In the 1994-95 season they won the National League 1 when beating Cannes XIII in the final 22-6 but declined promotion to the top flight . By 2013 the club was back in the 3rd tier the National Division 1 and finished runner-up to La Reole XIII losing the final 26-30. In season 2015-16 they won the National Division 1 East and after play-off wins against Realmont XIII and Saint Martin they lost the final to US Ferrals XIII 20-34 but were promoted back to the 2nd tier when that league was increased

Current squad
2021-22 Squad;
Rachid Amehiou
Philippe Anchisi
Raphael Andreuccetti
Nasr-Dine Bessaadia
Joris Cagnac
Thomas Cartier
Benjamin Cau
Cedric Chabanel
Julien Cordonnery
Jeremy Edy
Valetine Esteve
William Flutcher
Guillaume Fontanie
Cedric Gaillard
Sylvain Gaillard
Samuel Grondin
Thomas Isabel
Jimmy Jean
Thomas Jourdan
Amar Kachaou
Younes Khattabi
Christian Lopez
Cedric Malleterre
Mathias Navarro
Bastien Nicole
Florent Ricard
Maximilien Roupain
Mickael Roux
Olivier Warmee

Honours 

 National 2 (1): 1966-67
 Elite Two Championship (1): 1994-95

References

External links 

US Entraigues

French rugby league teams